The 2022 Central Michigan Chippewas football team represent Central Michigan University in the 2022 NCAA Division I FBS football season. They were led by fourth-year head coach Jim McElwain and play their home games at Kelly/Shorts Stadium as members of the West Division of the Mid-American Conference.

Previous season

The Chippewas finished the 2021 season 9–4 to finish tied for first place in the West Division.

Schedule

Game summaries

at No. 12 Oklahoma State

South Alabama

Bucknell

at No. 14 Penn State

at Toledo

Ball State

at Akron

Bowling Green

at Northern Illinois

Buffalo

Western Michigan

at Eastern Michigan

References

Central Michigan
Central Michigan Chippewas football seasons
Central Michigan Chippewas football